David Richard Miller (born 21 September 1974) is an English former cricketer. Miller was a right-handed batsman who occasionally played as a wicketkeeper.

Miller made his debut for Dorset in the 1998 Minor Counties Championship against Herefordshire. From 1998 to 2000, Miller represented Dorset in 14 Minor Counties Championship matches, with his final appearance for the county coming against Wiltshire.

In 1999, Miller played his only List-A match for Dorset in the 1999 NatWest Trophy against Scotland, where he scored 41 runs.

Miller continues to play for his beloved Poole Town CC in the Dorset cricket league. He is known county wide for the length of his middle stump which is reported to be one of the largest in the area

External links
David Miller at Cricinfo
David Miller at CricketArchive

1974 births
Living people
Cricketers from Poole
English cricketers
Dorset cricketers